Comunidad Cristiana Agua Viva  is a charismatic evangelical megachurch in Lima, Peru. As of 2017, it has seven locations in Lima Province.

History
Agua Viva was founded in 1985 by Juan Capurro and Alicia. In 2007, Sergio Hornung and Carla became senior pastors. In 2008, the church bought the Coliseo Amauta, a stadium with 18,000 seats. In 2020, the Church had 42,000 people.

Beliefs
The beliefs of the church are identified as part of Evangelical Christianity, currently part of the charismatic movement.

Locations
Lima District
Lurigancho-Chosica
Lince District
Los Olivos District
San Juan de Lurigancho
San Juan de Miraflores
Villa María del Triunfo

See also
List of the largest evangelical churches
List of the largest evangelical church auditoriums
Worship service (evangelicalism)

References

External links
 ccaguaviva.com - Official Website

Evangelical megachurches in Peru
Buildings and structures in Lima